Rockford is a city in Blount County, Tennessee, United States. Its population was 798 at the 2000 census and 856 at the 2010 census. It is included in the Knoxville, Tennessee Metropolitan Statistical Area.

History
Rockford is named for a river ford used by early 19th-century settlers and merchants travelling between Knoxville and Maryville. As its name implies, the ford was unusually rocky, and thus preferred by travellers, as large amounts of silt and sand made much of the Little River difficult to cross. The community was called "Rocky Ford" by the early 1800s.

Since the 1900s, the community has been the site of the Rockford Manufacturing Company, a yard cordage factory, and its adjacent and hazardous low head dam, formerly used to power the factory and now poses nothing more than a dangerous feature on the Little River, having been the site of numerous fatalities.

Rockford incorporated as a city in the early 1970s to avoid being annexed by Alcoa or Maryville, both of which were growing rapidly.

Geography
Rockford is located in northern Blount County at  (35.839243, -83.942221). The Little River, which rises in the Great Smoky Mountains and empties into the Tennessee River, passes through the city.

Climate
The climate in this area is characterized by relatively high temperatures and evenly distributed precipitation throughout the year.  According to the Köppen Climate Classification system, Rockford has a Humid subtropical climate, abbreviated "Cfa" on climate maps.

Demographics

As of the census of 2000, there were 798 people, 317 households, and 245 families residing in the city. The population density was 259.2 people per square mile (100.0/km2). There were 362 housing units at an average density of 117.6 per square mile (45.4/km2). The racial makeup of the city was 96.74% White, 1.13% African American, 0.13% Native American, 0.38% Asian, and 1.63% from two or more races. Hispanic or Latino of any race were 0.75% of the population.

There were 317 households, out of which 32.2% had children under the age of 18 living with them, 63.1% were married couples living together, 11.0% had a female householder with no husband present, and 22.4% were non-families. 18.3% of all households were made up of individuals, and 6.9% had someone living alone who was 65 years of age or older. The average household size was 2.52 and the average family size was 2.84.

In the city, the population was spread out, with 22.8% under the age of 18, 7.6% from 18 to 24, 29.4% from 25 to 44, 26.8% from 45 to 64, and 13.3% who were 65 years of age or older. The median age was 40 years. For every 100 females, there were 93.2 males. For every 100 females age 18 and over, there were 91.3 males.

The median income for a household in the city was $43,816, and the median income for a family was $50,074. Males had a median income of $34,583 versus $26,250 for females. The per capita income for the city was $19,938. About 6.9% of families and 8.4% of the population were below the poverty line, including 10.9% of those under age 18 and 4.2% of those age 65 or over.

Education
Rockford has one public school, Rockford Elementary School, a K-5 elementary school that is part of the Blount County Schools system. The school is located at 2738 Williams Mill Road.

References

External links

Cities in Tennessee
Cities in Blount County, Tennessee
Knoxville metropolitan area